Louis Joseph Xavier, Duke of Burgundy (13 September 1751 – 22 March 1761), was born a French prince of the House of Bourbon, and as such was second-in-line to the throne of France, ranking behind his father, the Dauphin Louis, himself the son of Louis XV. Although Louis was his parents' first son to be born alive, he died of extra-pulmonary tuberculosis at the young age of nine. As a result of his untimely death, all three of his three younger brothers - Louis Auguste, Louis Stanislas, and Charles Philippe - became kings of France.

Early life

Louis Joseph Xavier was born at the Palace of Versailles. He was the second surviving child and eldest son of Louis, Dauphin of France and Maria Josepha of Saxony, and was thus the oldest brother to the future kings Louis XVI, Louis XVIII and Charles X. It is a known fact that he was the favorite child of his parents, and was said to be handsome and bright.

He was put in the care of Marie Isabelle de Rohan and given the title of Duke of Burgundy by his grandfather, King Louis XV. He was much loved by those who were close to him, especially his older sister Marie Zéphyrine, who died at the age of five in 1755. It is unknown if the Duke, who was not even four years old yet, was affected by this. It is known, however, that the absence of his older sister was felt by the Duke.

Death
The young Duke was pushed off a wooden horse by one of his playmates in 1759. As he was recognized for his kindness, he did not tell anyone about this, in order to prevent his friend from getting into any trouble. After this incident, the Duke of Burgundy's health started to deteriorate quickly. The family's physician, Dr. Barbier, decided to operate on him in 1760. The Duke was operated on while he was conscious. Knowing that he would die, the Dauphin had him baptised on 29 November 1760, with Louis XV and Marie Leszczyńska, his grandparents, as his godparents. Until that moment, he had been known just as "Burgundy". By 1761, the Duke was bound to his bed, unable to move his legs, with what was diagnosed as extra pulmonary tuberculosis of the bone. He later died from this disease, on 22 March 1761.

Ancestors

References

1751 births
1761 deaths
18th-century deaths from tuberculosis
18th-century French people
Burials at the Basilica of Saint-Denis
House of Bourbon
People from Versailles
Princes of France (Bourbon)
Courtesy dukes
Knights of the Golden Fleece of Spain
Tuberculosis deaths in France
Royalty and nobility who died as children